Ornixola caudulatella is a moth of the family Gracillariidae. It is known from France, Italy, Germany, Austria, Poland, Hungary,  Slovakia, the Czech Republic, Romania, Greece, Lithuania, Latvia, Estonia, Russia and Ukraine.

There are two generations per year with adults on wing from May to June and again from July to August in Hungary.

The larvae feed on Salix species, including Salix caprea and Salix acutifolia.

References

Gracillariinae
Moths of Europe
Moths described in 1839